Lytx is a San Diego, California based technology company that designs, manufactures and sells video telematics products used by commercial and public-sector fleets to help improve driver safety and business productivity. Products include risk detection, fleet tracking, and driver safety programs that use artificial intelligence and analysts to identify risky driving behaviors and report real-time fleet information. The company's clients include waste management and sanitation companies, trucking and distribution, government and municipality vehicles, passenger transit, construction, utilities, telecom and field services. Lytx also provides compliance services for trucking fleets regulated by the U.S. Department of Transportation.

History

Founding 

Lytx, formerly DriveCam, Inc., was founded in 1998 by Gary Rayner. Rayner wanted a version of a "black box recorder" that could identify the root cause of vehicle crashes, which could then provide clues about how to avoid such accidents in the future. Rayner developed a driver recording system that could gather data from incident and driving recordings to provide insight into driver behavior and other factors influencing crashes.

In 1999, DriveCam received a grant from the Transportation Research Board (Administered by the National Academies of Sciences) to test the viability and utility of information captured by the DriveCam Video Event Data Recorder (VEDR). Also in 1999, Gary Rayner met Tom Lafleur at an engineering conference, and Lafleur became co-founder and the lead investor for an angel investment group that made the initial outside investment in DriveCam. Lafleur joined the company as chief technology officer and ultimately served as a board member where he remained until the company's acquisition in 2016.

2000–2016 
In early 2000, Ed Andrew joined as President while Gary Rayner managed the hardware and software product development teams. Rayner remained with the company as CEO and Chairman of the board until April 2003.

By November 2002, the company received three patents for technology related to its DriveCam video event data recorder.

In 2005, DriveCam was included on Inc. Magazine's list of the 500 fastest-growing, privately held companies in the U.S. and remained on this list for three consecutive years.

In 2006, the company was listed as one of the top 200 contenders for the Red Herring 100 North America list.

In 2007, DriveCam partnered with American Family Insurance to provide a video feedback program in which parents could review the driving actions of their teens. In 2010, the Teen Safe Driver Program was awarded the 2010 Teen Driving Safety Leadership Award by the National Safety Council. Scientists at the University of Iowa used the program to produce a 70% reduction in risky driving behavior. As of 2017, the company no longer offers the DriveCam for Families program.

In September 2008, Brandon Nixon became the company's CEO.  Also in 2008, the company introduced RiskPredict, a pattern-recognition software that could be used to help predict the riskiest drivers within a fleet. Through a process of scoring, prioritizing and tracking the results of individual driver behaviors, the model identifies those behaviors that would most likely lead to a collision.

In 2009, the company launched DriveCam Online, a driver management portal.

In 2010, DriveCam added new clients including Sysco, Masco and the Washington Metropolitan Transit Authority. The company also extended its contracts with AmeriGas and Waste Connections.  Later in 2010, DriveCam was listed as No. 30 on the Wall Street Journal's List of Top 50 Venture-Backed Companies.  Also in 2010, DriveCam released fuel management and real-time fleet tracking services.

In April 2011, DriveCam was awarded a Blanket Purchase Agreement by the General Services Administration for the purchase of in-vehicle video recorders and driver feedback systems. In August 2011, DriveCam became an awarded National Joint Purchasing Alliance vendor. Also in 2011, ONEOK, Public Service Electric and Gas Co. (PSE&G), Waste Industries, Linde and Pat Salmon & Sons joined as new clients. DriveCam also expanded its operations internationally with contracts in Canada and South Africa. In December 2011, DriveCam announced its acquisition of Rair Technologies, LLC, a provider of compliance services for commercial trucking fleets. Upon completion of the acquisition, Rair maintained its headquarters in Brookfield, WI.

In February 2013, DriveCam added Greyhound Lines as a client. And on November 4, 2013, the company changed its corporate name from DriveCam Inc. to Lytx Inc.

In 2014, Lytx added Con-way Freight as a client.  The same year, Sentry Insurance and ARI Insurance announced they would provide their insured commercial clients with subsidies to defray the cost of adopting the DriveCam event recorder. Also in 2014, The Virginia Tech Transportation Institute (VTTI) conducted a study of heavy truck and bus collisions. They found that Lytx's video-based driver safety program has the potential to reduce fatalities, collisions and injuries.

In 2015, Lytx launched its ActiveVision service at the American Trucking Associations' annual Management Conference and Exhibition in Philadelphia. The service uses machine vision technology to identify patterns that may be indicative of distracted and drowsy driving such as lane departures and following distances.

2017–present 

In 2017, the company launched Lytx Video Services, adding access to near livestream video and continuous recording up to 100 hours. The company also added Walmart and U. S. Xpress as clients along with UK based tour coach company The Travellers Choice.

At the start of 2018, the company announced it had products in more than 3,000 commercial and government fleets with more than 850,000 drivers.   Also in 2018, Nationwide partnered with the company to add the DriveCam safety program to Nationwide's long-haul trucking fleets. Frost & Sullivan reported Lytx's market share at more than 60% of the video telematics market. Later that year, Mack Trucks announced an offer of a pre-wire option of DriveCam and Video Services in all Granite Class 8 vehicles.

In February 2019, the company introduced a configurable product portfolio based on the Lytx Video Platform, with the Lytx DriveCam® Event Recorder as the foundational product. At this time, product names including Lytx Video Services and ActiveVision were retired and new program and service names were introduced: Risk Detection Service, Driver Safety Program and Fleet Tracking Service. The brand DriveCam was only used to refer to the hardware.

Also in 2019, Lytx joined the Qualcomm Smart Cities Accelerator Program. The Accelerator Program plans to use the dataset compiled from more than 100 billion miles of driving data and over 1 million drivers to help smart cities improve traffic and transit flows. Also in 2019, the company added Hogan Transportation, The Caillier Group, and The Trucking Alliance as clients.

In December 2019 the company changed the name of its compliance offering from RAIR Compliance Services to Lytx Compliance Services. Lytx was also awarded Company of the Year for Video Safety Solutions by industry analyst firm Frost & Sullivan.

In February 2020, Lytx announced an expansion of its machine vision system and artificial intelligence technology.  The new technology allows the Lytx DriveCam® Event Recorder to record inside-facing movement triggers along with road-facing movements. The event recorder will provide near real-time insight into potentially risky behaviors such as distracted driving, texting while driving, failure to stop at intersections, weaving between lanes, and following other vehicles at unsafe distances.

In March 2021, Fast Company announced their top ten most innovative companies in data science and included Lytx as #9 citing Lytx's updated platform, new AI and machine learning technologies that identified phone use 133% more often, and 120 billion miles of driving data as reasons for the award.

Funding history

In November 2011, Lytx received an $85-million investment from Welsh, Carson, Anderson & Stowe to fund expansion and the acquisition of RAIR Technologies. The acquisition provided web-based safety and regulatory compliance solutions for DOT-regulated fleets. The acquisition also added patents to Lytx's existing patent portfolio.

In February 2013, Volvo Group Venture Capital invested in Lytx and became a minority shareholder.

On February 18, 2016, GCTR, a Chicago-based private equity firm, announced it had agreed to purchase Lytx for $500 million in an all cash transaction that closed the first quarter of 2016. Prior investors in the company included Insight Venture Partners, Integral Capital Partners, JMI Equity, Menlo Ventures, Triangle Peak Partners, Welsh, Carson, Anderson & Stowe and Griffen LLC.

In April 2018, Clearlake Capital announced it had invested an undisclosed amount in Lytx.  Other investors in 2018 included HarbourVest Partners, Public Sector Pension Investment Board and Guggenheim Investments.

In January 2020, Lytx announced a majority investment from Permira making this the largest investment in video telematics to date. The investment puts the value of Lytx at over $2.5 billion.

Product
Lytx provides the following products:
Lytx Video Platform - In 2019, the company introduced Lytx Video Platform as its foundational product offering. It is available as a standalone product, with the Lytx DriveCam® Event Recorder, and is required to enable other products such as the Risk Detection Service, Fleet Tracking Service and the Driver Safety Program. The platform provides streaming access of up to 100 hours of continually recorded video. The Video Platform lets users plug additional cameras into the system, allowing for multiple views from the same vehicle, such as side and rear-facing views, along with a road-facing camera. It also allows managers to livestream video from the road. Users can access video from a few minutes to weeks in the past.
Lytx DriveCam® Event Recorder - A dash cam that powers the Lytx Video Platform by collecting and processing data and video. It uses two wide angle lenses to capture events in front of and behind a vehicle, covering a 360-degree view. The dash cam captures events generated by the recorder's g-force sensors while also providing real-time in-cab feedback to the driver.  DriveCam uses machine vision and artificial intelligence with a video event recorder to identify and categorize moments on the road. It also includes a microphone and light and audio alerts. In 2020, Lytx upgraded the event recorder technology to monitor risky driving behavior by capturing inside-facing triggers. The dash cam now identifies potential distractions and risk factors such as cell phone use, seatbelt use, weaving between lanes, and failure to stop at intersections. 
Driver Safety Program - Uses machine vision, artificial intelligence and professional review to identify and report risky driving behaviors to help clients coach their employees to change their behavior to minimize risky driving behaviors. In 2020, Lytx updated the machine vision and artificial intelligence technology to include four new triggers: handheld device, seatbelt use, food and beverages, and driver smoking. 
Risk Detection Service - The service uses data pulled from video telematics and dash cams to identify and alert managers to risky driving events in real time. Risks are predicted using a combination of machine vision (MV), which recognizes objects and human behavior in images, and artificial intelligence (AI), which uses voice recognition, collision detection and risky driver behavior detection to anticipate events.
Fleet Tracking Service - The DriveCam Event Recorder has integrated GPS-based fleet tracking software that can provide real-time locations of drivers. The recorder also provides fuel and maintenance insights by measuring vehicle idling and speeding. 
Lytx Compliance Services - The web-based tool allows carriers to track, document and manage driver logs required by the Department of Transportation and the Electronic Logging Device (ELD) mandates as required by the Federal Motor Carrier Safety Administration.  The service includes alerts and reports along with audits of driver qualification files.

Patents
The company holds 93 patents for its video event recorder, automatic driver risk assessment, driver detection and warnings, and performance tracking technology.

Lytx has an additional 64 registered trademarks and 54 pending patents as of March 19, 2018. Patents relate to operations in North America, Europe, Africa, Australia, the United States, Canada, Ireland, the United Kingdom, South Africa and the Philippines.

In 2011, Lytx, then DriveCam, Inc., filed a lawsuit against SmartDrive Systems citing patent infringement. The two companies resolved their patent disputes in 2012.

See also
 Vehicle tracking system
 Fuel management system

References

External links
 

Driver's education
Companies based in San Diego
Privately held companies based in California
American companies established in 1998